Albino Lake is a lake in Gallatin County, Montana in the Madison Range in south central Montana.

The lake has historically been stocked by the United States Forest Service with
rainbow trout and Yellowstone cutthroat trout. Montana Fish, Wildlife, and Parks reports that the population of rainbow trout, last stocked in the 1950s, has died out, but the cutthroats remain.

References

Lakes of Montana
Bodies of water of Gallatin County, Montana